Thomas Huston Roderick, Ph.D., (1930–2013) was an American geneticist who coined the term “genomics".

Roderick earned degrees from the University of Michigan in philosophy in 1952 and zoology in 1953 and went on receive a Ph.D. from the University of California, Berkeley. He then joined The Jackson Laboratory in Bar Harbor as a geneticist.  He researched behavioral genetics, the effects of radiation on genetic material, and bioinformatics. In 1973–1975 he worked at the United States Atomic Energy Commission, examining the health impacts of nuclear radiation.

References

1930 births
2013 deaths
American geneticists
University of Michigan College of Literature, Science, and the Arts alumni
University of California, Berkeley alumni